Yarımca is a village in Kovancılar district of Elazığ Province, Turkey. It is situated to the north of Keban Dam resorvoir. Its population is 1,080 (2021). Before the 2013 reorganisation, it was a town (belde). The village is populated by Kurds.

References

Kurdish settlements in Elazığ Province
Villages in Kovancılar District